Thomas Brussig (born 1964) is a German writer best known for his satirical novels that deal with the German Democratic Republic.

Life 

Brussig was born in East Berlin.  After attending the "Heinrich-Hertz" School, he went on to train as a builder. In 1984 he finished school and training, and served in the East German National People's Army (German: Nationale Volksarmee or NVA). Brussig found it difficult to wield a weapon and had a hard time. He worked as a museum guard, cleaner and hotel porter among a variety of other odd jobs until the early 90s. In 1990 he studied sociology at the Free University of Berlin. He changed universities 3 years later to study the art of film-making. He graduated in the year 2000.

Thomas Brussig commutes back and forth from Berlin to Mecklenburg as a writer and is married.

Works 

Brussig's first novel, Wasserfarben ("Watercolors") was published in 1991 under the pseudonym "Cordt Berneburger." In 1995, he published his breakthrough novel, Helden wie wir (Heroes Like Us, FSG 1997), which dealt with the fall of the Berlin Wall. The book was a critical and commercial success and was later turned into a movie. Two movies of his books have been released, "Helden wie wir" and "Sonnenallee".

Bibliography 
 
 
 *

Filmography 
1999:  Sonnenallee – Dir. Leander Haußmann (with Detlev Buck, Robert Stadlober, Alexander Beyer)
1999:   – Dir.

Awards 

 2000 Hans Fallada Prize

External links 
 
 ub.fu-berlin.de – Thomas Brussig link collection

References 

1964 births
Living people
People from East Berlin
20th-century German novelists
21st-century German novelists
German satirists
Writers from Berlin
German male novelists
German male non-fiction writers